Mr. Marumakan is a 2012 Malayalam-language comedy-drama film written by the duo Udayakrishna-Siby K. Thomas and directed by Sandhya Mohan . The movie stars Dileep in the lead role with Sanusha, Bhagyaraj, Khushbu Sundar, Sheela, Biju Menon, Nedumudi Venu and Riyaz Khan in supporting roles. The film is a remake of the 1989 Telugu film Attaku Yamudu Ammayiki Mogudu. Some scenes of the film is borrowed from another 1971 Malayalam film Oru Penninte Kadha.

The film tells the story of three rich arrogant women, Raja Kokila, her adopted daughter Raja Mallika and her daughter Raja Lakshmi who believe that a woman can rule without the help of a man. However, the entry of a lawyer-trained drama director Ashok Raj into their lives forces them to revise their opinions.

Plot 
The movie is about an Advocate Ashok Chakravarthy, who enters into the life of three arrogant women who are all of the belief that a woman can survive without a husband.
Their thoughts are changed when one of the three, Ashok Raj, marries Raja Lakshmi. Into his life also enters a banking Ombudsman Balasubramanyam, his father Raja Gopalan Thampi's childhood friend. The three women's business entity is known as Raja's Groups of Company as they are Raja Kokila, who is Chairperson of Raja's Groups of Company, Raja Mallika and Raja Lakshmi. His entry into their family later reveals that Raja Kokila is step-mother to Raja Mallika, who was adopted when she was minor. Also, after the death of Raja Kokila's husband, she became the sole owner of her husband's assets and changed her name from Kokila to Raja Kokila. It is also revealed that the mother of Raja Mallika is their maid Bhavaniyamma. The movie ends with the reunion of Raja Mallika with both her husband and mother.

Cast

Critical reception 
Metro Matinee gave the movie a verdict of "Time-Pass Entertainer", concluding that "On the whole, 'Mr. Marumakan' is a crowd-pleaser that knows exactly who its audience is. For die-hard fans of Dileep, this old-fashioned entertainer is a treat and delivers enough entertainment for your buck".

Sify the movie a verdict of "Strictly for Dileep fans!", commenting that "Mr. Marumakan is as archaic as formula is to films and it is packaged as an old-school masala potboiler aimed at Dileep fans. It is exaggerated and formulaic, but relies squarely on the charm of its leading man to pull off its over-the-top tone. And when you walk out of the theatres, you realize why Dileep is called the Janapriya Nayakan."

Paresh C. Palicha of Rediff gave the movie 2/5 stars, stating that "Mr. Marumakan is a typical Dileep film, not one expected from someone who is recently honoured as the Best Actor by the Kerala State Government."

Awards

References 

2010s Malayalam-language films
2012 films
Malayalam remakes of Telugu films
Films scored by Suresh Peters